SSIM may refer to:

General
 Structural similarity in image processing
 South Sudan Independence Movement
 Saturated structured illumination microscopy
 Standard Schedules Information Manual in aviation

Educational institutions
 Swedish School in Moscow (Svenska Skolan i Moskva)
 S. S. Institute of Medical Sciences, a medical school in Davanagere, Karnataka, India
 Sri Siddhartha Institute of Management Studies in Tumkur, Karnataka, India